Dream League Soccer is an association football video game series developed by British studio First Touch Games and designed for Android and iOS.

Originally released on 6 May 2011 as "First Touch Soccer", the game produced two editions, after which it was rebranded as its current form. Several editions have been released since then, all under the name "DLS". The latest edition is DLS 2023, a.k.a DLS 23, released on 1 December 2022.

Sequels 
Though originally starting the game as First Touch Soccer, FTG has removed the First Touch Soccer title and replaced it with the DLS series. The game has several sequels, with a new edition being released yearly. As of 1 December 2022, the latest sequel is DLS 2023.

Gameplay 
Dream League Soccer allows players to create and manage their own soccer team, advancing from the lower divisions of a fictitious league to the top division. Since the game has the FIFPRO license, players can sign real-life players to their team via an in-game transfer market and compete in league or cup matches against other teams. There is also a training mode in the game where players can improve the abilities of their team members.

The game has 3D graphics, realistic animations, and an in-game commentary team that provides commentary during matches. The game also features licensed music tracks that play during matches and on menu screens.

The game is controlled by a virtual joystick and screen buttons. Using these controls, players can move their players around the field, pass the ball, and shoot on goal.

Players can customise their team's uniform, crest and stadium in the game. They can also select from various formations and tactics based on their preferred playing style. The game also has an option allowing users to import their own DLS Kit to the game.

As players compete in matches, they earn experience points that they can use to improve the abilities of their teammates. To improve their overall performance, players can also train their players in specific areas such as passing, shooting, and tackling.

Update

Early years 
Dream League Soccer is a mobile soccer game developed by First Touch Games (FTG) that was first released on May 6, 2011 under the name First Touch Soccer (FTS). The game has undergone several transformations since its initial release, with the manufacturer releasing two versions of the game under the FTS name in 2014 and 2015. Around this time, the previous version of First Touch Soccer was renamed Dream League Soccer, which is the name it currently goes by.

In addition to the name change, First Touch Games officially replaced the previous FTS game with DLS Classic. This first version of the game is similar to the original FTS, but only has four levels: Division 3, Division 2, Division 1, and Elite Division. The game features one Global Challenge Cup, as well as an Elite Cup for Elite Division teams, and only includes 64 teams, including the player's own team. The graphics of the game at this time were not particularly impressive.

This edition of Dream League Soccer also marked the last time that Bundesliga teams and legendary players were featured in the game. Despite its humble beginnings, Dream League Soccer has become a popular mobile soccer game with a large following, and continues to receive regular updates and improvements to its gameplay and graphics.

2016-2019 
Dream League Soccer 2016 marked a significant milestone in the DLS series, as First Touch Games (FTG) brought major upgrades to the game's graphics, making them more realistic. The update also included a substantial increase in the number of teams available, with 96 teams now included in the game across six levels: Academy Division, Division 3, Division 2, Division 1, Junior Elite Division, and Elite Division. To help players get started, the game also provides a starting capital of 1000 coins to build their team.

In terms of gameplay, the Global Challenge Cup remained unchanged, while the Elite Cup was made available only to teams from the Junior Elite Division and above. Additionally, the online game mode received a major overhaul, providing players with an improved and more enjoyable experience. Overall, Dream League Soccer 2016 was a significant upgrade from its predecessor, with new features and improvements that added to the game's overall enjoyment.

Dream League Soccer (DLS) is a popular mobile soccer game developed and published by First Touch Games (FTG). Since its initial release in 2016, DLS has undergone several updates and changes.

The 2017 update of DLS introduced several new features, including the ability to change the logo using given templates, a decrease in the number of squads from 20 to 12, and the addition of third shirt colors. Furthermore, the maximum number of players in the club was limited to 32, but there was no limit to the number of reserve players brought into the match, unlike in DLS 2016.

The subsequent versions of DLS, namely DLS 2018 and DLS 2019, were not significantly updated, with the focus mainly on improving the graphics of the game. However, DLS 2018 introduced the ability to create your own player.

One of the biggest issues faced by DLS during this period was the prevalence of hacks, cheats, and mods in the game. As the game saves information on the machine, it was easy for players to create hack and mod files. To address this problem, FTG implemented measures in DLS 2020 to prevent such activities.

Overall, DLS has been a successful mobile soccer game that has undergone several updates and changes, with FTG striving to improve the game experience and address issues faced by players.

2020-2022 
Dream League Soccer 2020 (DLS 2020) is a mobile soccer game developed and published by First Touch Games. Released in late 2020, it brought significant changes to the game's structure and gameplay.

One of the most noticeable changes in DLS 2020 is the increase in the player's capital amount from 1000 coins to 1500 coins and 75 diamonds. Additionally, the number of teams was expanded to 128, and the number of leagues increased from 6 to 8. The Junior Elite Division was removed and replaced by the Elite Division and Legendary Division, while the Amateur Division and Division 4 were added between the Academy Division and Division 3.

To unlock the logo templates, players now need to pay either coins (50 cents) or diamonds (20 diamonds). The stats of the players in the game also underwent a significant reduction.

Furthermore, the stadium and facilities were divided into six sections: Stadium, Commercial, Training, Medical, Accommodation, and Recruitment. In order to meet the promotion conditions in each new league, players need to upgrade their stadium.

DLS 2020 introduced a new and improved gameplay experience, with various new features and changes to the game's structure. It remains a popular choice for mobile soccer game enthusiasts who enjoy building and managing their own teams.

In Dream League Soccer 2020 (DLS 2020), players can upgrade their stadium up to five times, with prices ranging from 75 diamonds (1 star) to 375 diamonds (5 stars). The total cost for all upgrades is 1125 diamonds.

To combat game hacking, First Touch Games (FTG) implemented a single server to store player information, requiring the game to always be played in online mode, including when playing with the machine.

The transfer section in DLS 2020 allows players to purchase up to 9 players based on the team's stats. Alternatively, they can use an Agent to sign any one player or use a Scout to find two random players with discounts. Choosing to use the Agent requires payment in diamonds (Common: 40 diamonds, Rare: 240 diamonds, Legendary: 350 diamonds), while Scout payments are made in coins (Common: 75 cents, Rare: 225 cents, Legendary: 500 cents). Discounts are available if the player upgrades their Recruitment facility.

Overall, DLS 2020 offers various new features and changes to the game's structure, including upgrades to the stadium, a single server to prevent game hacking, and a transfer system that requires strategic planning and resource management. These additions provide players with an enhanced and engaging mobile soccer gaming experience.

References 

2011 video games
Android (operating system) games
IOS games
Association football video games
Video games developed in the United Kingdom